Acalyptris minimella is a moth of the family Nepticulidae. It is widespread and common in the western Mediterranean region, usually not far from the sea. It has been recorded from Portugal, Spain, France, Italy, Croatia, Ibiza, Mallorca, Corsica, Sardinia and Sicily. It is also present in North Africa, where it has been recorded from Morocco, Algeria and Tunisia.

The wingspan is 4.1-5.8 mm. There are two or more generations per year.

The larvae feed on Pistacia lentiscus and Pistacia terebinthus. They mine the leaves of their host plant. The mine consists of an extremely narrow gallery, filled with frass, running a rather straight course, often following the margin of the leaflet or the midrib. The thin part is more than half the total length of the mine. Later, the mine widens gradually and becomes more contorted, often following a zigzag course. The exit hole is located on the leaf upperside.

References

External links 
 Acalyptris Meyrick: revision of the platani and staticis groups in Europe and the Mediterranean (Lepidoptera: Nepticulidae)
 bladmineerders.nl

Nepticulidae
Moths of Europe
Moths of Africa
Moths described in 1926